Clark is an unincorporated community in northern Storey County and southern Washoe County, about  east of Reno and Sparks. Clark can be accessed from the north via Interstate 80 on the USA Parkway exit, and from the west via roads from nearby Lockwood.

Clark has also been known as Clark Siding, Clark Station, Clarks, and Clarks Siding.

History
In around 1862, James Clark, boss of Chinese laborers on the Central Pacific Railroad, settled in the area.  Clark raised potatoes and hay for Virginia City.
The post office was called Clarks from April 1890 until March 1894. The post office was called Clark from November 1906 to March 1907 and July 1912 to July 1919.

Tesla's Gigafactory 1, which produces batteries, is located nearby.

References

External links
 James Barkley's notes about Horace Hamilton Minkler, and James Clark (cprr.org) - photocopies of a number of sources that mention James Clark and include photos of Clarks Station.

Unincorporated communities in Storey County, Nevada
Unincorporated communities in Washoe County, Nevada